Acanthosis nigricans is a medical sign characterised by brown-to-black, poorly defined, velvety hyperpigmentation of the skin. It is usually found in body folds, such as the posterior and lateral folds of the neck, the armpits, groin, navel, forehead and other areas.

It is associated with endocrine dysfunction, especially insulin resistance and hyperinsulinaemia, as seen in diabetes mellitus. This activates the insulin-like growth factor receptors, which leads to proliferation of keratinocytes, fibroblasts and other cells in the skin. Activation of other growth factor receptors such as fibroblast growth factor receptors or epidermal growth factor receptor can also be responsible.

Signs and symptoms
Acanthosis nigricans may present with thickened, velvety, relatively darker areas of skin on the neck, armpit and in skin folds.

Causes
It typically occurs in individuals younger than age 40, is associated with insulin resistance, Type 2 diabetes, obesity or endocrinopathies, such as hypothyroidism, acromegaly, polycystic ovary syndrome or Cushing's disease, and may be genetically inherited.

Type I – familial
Familial acanthosis may arise as a result of an autosomal dominant trait, presenting at birth or developing during childhood.

Type II – endocrine
Endocrine syndromes associated with acanthosis nigricans can develop in many conditions, particularly: 
 starts with insulin resistance, such as diabetes mellitus and metabolic syndrome
 excess circulating androgens, particularly Cushing's disease, acromegaly, polycystic ovary syndrome
 Addison's disease and hypothyroidism
 Rare diseases, including pinealoma, leprechaunism, lipoatrophic diabetes, pineal hyperplasia syndrome, pituitary basophilism, ovarian hyperthecosis, stromal luteoma, ovarian dermoid cysts, Prader-Willi syndrome, and Alström syndrome.

Acanthosis nigricans associated with endocrine dysfunction is more insidious in its onset, is less widespread, and the patients are often concurrently obese.

Type III – obesity and pseudoacanthosis nigricans
In young persons, acanthosis nigricans is a visible marker which strongly suggests insulin resistance. Higher than normal insulin levels in the blood stream cause the growth of darkened skin over certain areas of the body. No skin treatment will get rid of AN. Acanthosis nigricans may lighten up and possibly go away by treating the root cause, insulin resistance, but it can take months or years to do so. Insulin resistance syndromes may be divided into type A (HAIR-AN) and type B syndromes.

The majority of cases of acanthosis nigricans are associated with obesity and otherwise idiopathic. This is likely because of insulin resistance and more likely to occur in darker-skinned persons. This can also be referred to as pseudoacanthosis nigricans. In some cases, AN attributable to obesity and insulin resistance will occur on ones face. Most typically it will be present as a horizontal band on the forehead, but may also appear as perioral hyperpigmentation, periorbital hyperpigmentation, or generalized facial skin darkening.

Type IV – drug-related
Acanthosis nigricans has been linked to the use of nicotinic acid, glucocorticoid use, combined oral contraceptive pills, and growth hormone therapy.

Type V – malignancy 
Malignant acanthosis nigricans refers to acanthosis nigricans occurring as a paraneoplastic syndrome associated with a cancer. Malignant acanthosis nigricans is most commonly associated with gastrointestinal adenocarcinomas, as well as genitourinary cancers such as those of the prostate, breast, and ovary. Other cancers, such as those of the lung, stomach, and lymphoma, are occasionally associated with acanthosis nigricans.

This form of acanthosis nigricans is more likely to involve mucous membranes (25–50% of cases) Malignant acanthosis nigricans that may either precede (18%), accompany (60%), or follow (22%) the onset of an internal cancer. Malignancy-associated acanthosis nigricans is usually rapid in onset and may be accompanied by skin tags, multiple seborrheic keratoses, or tripe palms.

Acral acanthotic anomaly
Acral acanthotic anomaly refers to a variant of acanthosis nigricans limited to the elbows, knees, knuckles, and dorsal surfaces of the feet, in the absence of any other findings, in otherwise healthy individuals. While the etiology remains unknown, its presence does not suggest a likelihood of malignancy.

Pathophysiology
Acanthosis nigricans is caused by increased activation of growth factor receptor proteins, usually due to endocrine dysfunction. This is most commonly insulin-mediated activation of IGF receptors on keratinocytes, as a result of hyperinsulinaemia or insulin resistance, as seen in diabetes mellitus.

Factors involved in the development of acanthosis nigricans include:
 Increased circulating insulin. This activates keratinocyte IGF receptors, particularly IGF-1. At high concentrations, insulin may also displace IGF-1 from insulin-like growth factor-binding protein (IGFBP). Increased circulating IGF may lead to keratinocyte and dermal fibroblast proliferation.
 In hereditary forms of acanthosis nigricans, fibroblast growth factor receptor (FGFR) defects
 Increased transforming growth factor (TGF), which appears to be the mechanism for malignancy-associated acanthosis nigricans. TGF acts on epidermal tissue via the epidermal growth factor receptor (EGFR).

In conjunction with increased end levels of IGF, it is likely that perspiration and friction may be necessary predeterminants for lesions, since the level of insulin is usually not enough to activate IGF receptors across the body.

Diagnosis
Acanthosis nigricans is typically diagnosed clinically. A skin biopsy may be needed in unusual cases. If no clear cause is obvious, it may be necessary to search for one. Blood tests, an endoscopy, or X-rays may be required to eliminate the possibility of diabetes or cancer as the cause.

On biopsy, hyperkeratosis, epidermal folding, leukocyte infiltration, and melanocyte proliferation may be seen.

Differential diagnosis
Acanthosis nigricans should be distinguished from the casal collar appearing in pellagra.

Classification
Acanthosis nigricans is conventionally divided into benign and malignant forms, although may be divided into syndromes according to cause:
 Benign This may include obesity-related, hereditary, and endocrine forms of acanthosis nigricans.
 Malignant. This may include forms that are associated with tumour products and insulin-like activity, or tumour necrosis factor.

An alternate classification system still used to describe acanthosis nigricans was proposed in 1994. It delineates acanthosis nigricans syndromes according to their associated syndromes, including benign and malignant forms, forms associated with obesity and drugs, acral acanthosis nigricans, unilateral acanthosis nigricans, and mixed and syndromic forms.

Treatment
People with acanthosis nigricans should be screened for diabetes and, although rare, cancer. Controlling blood glucose levels through exercise and diet often improves symptoms. Topical fade creams (normally used for eliminating age spots) can lighten skin cosmetically in less severe cases. Selenium sulfide topical 2 percent applied in thin layer to dry skin ten minutes prior to bathing may clear symptoms. Selenium sulfide applied to dry scalp or skin is an inexpensive well tolerated treatment to balance skin's biome and works by drying fungus like tinea versicolor that can coexist with acanthosis and exacerbate discoloration. Acanthosis nigricans maligna may resolve if the causative tumor is successfully removed.

Prognosis
Acanthosis nigricans is likely to improve in circumstances where a known cause is removed. For example, obesity-related acanthosis nigricans will improve with weight loss, and drug-induced acanthosis nigricans is likely to resolve when the drug is ceased. Hereditary variants may or may not fade with age, and malignancy-associated variants may, after a malignancy is removed, fade.

References

External links 

Endocrine-related cutaneous conditions
Medical signs
Medical conditions related to obesity